Isnik Alimi (born 2 February 1994) is an Albanian professional footballer who plays as a central midfielder for Gabala.

Club career

Early career - FK Ohrid
Born in Delogoždi a village based in Struga Municipality, Alimi started his youth career at age of 7 with Macedonian side FK Vlaznimi Struga. In 2010, he moved at FK Ohrid and in 2011 he was promoted to the first team. On 30 July 2011 Alimi made it his debut with the first team coming as a substitute in place of Aleksandar Dalčeski in second-half's start of the match finished in a 2–0 away loss against FK Renova for the Macedonian First League championship.

Chievo
In 2013, he moved abroad for the first time joining Serie A side Chievo. He stood for a year season with Primavera team.

With Primvaera team he won Italian Superleague, he score a goal against Juventus in the first game, also mark the goal against Fiorentina in the semifinals, he helped lead his team to winning the championship because Isnik Alimi  was the team captain and key player.
He had 21 matches and 10 goals with Primavera team.

Loan to Lumezzane
On 6 August 2014 the Lega Pro Prima Divisione side A.C. Lumezzane, announced to have signed Alimi from Chievo on loan mode.

He made it his first professional debut on 31 August 2014, playing as a starter in the opening match of the Lega Pro against Pordenone, finished in the clean 2–0 victory.

He finished his first half of the season with Lumezzane with 12 Appearances, 8 as a starter and 4 coming on as a substitute.

Alimi scored his first goal for Lumezzane in the opening match of the year 2015 against Novara valid for the 19th game week, played on 6 January and finished in the away 1–3 victory, in where Alimi scored the second goal for 0–2 result in the 45th minute in the end of first half.

Alimi concluded the 2014–15 season making in total 27 appearances, from where 21 in the starting line up, scored 2 goals and provided 3 assists.

Atalanta
After 1-year loaned to Lumezzane, Alimi got returned to Chievo, but on 26 June 2015 he signed with the fellow Serie A team Atalanta B.C. a 4-years contract.

Loan to Maceratese
In the closing day of the 2015 Summer Transfers Window Alimi got loaned out to the Lega Pro just promoted side S.S. Maceratese 1922.

Loan to Vicenza
In the 2017 Summer Transfers Window, Alimi was loaned out for the third time to Lega Pro at Vicenza.

Loan to Imolese
On 9 August 2019, he joined Serie C club Imolese on a season-long loan.

Loan to Šibenik
On 18 September 2020, Alimi joined Croatian First Football League club HNK Šibenik on a season-long loan.

Gabala
On 30 July 2021, Alimi signed a one-year contract with Gabala. On 22 May 2022, Gabala announced that Alimi had signed a new one-year contract with the club.

International career

Macedonia under-19

Albania
Having played for Macedonia U19, Alimi was called up highery from Macedonia national under-21 football team for the friendly match against Israel on 13 August 2014, but he refused the invitation as he wanted to play for Albania instead at international level due to his ethnicity. On 24 September 2014 proceedings were begun to give him the Albanian passport to be eligible to play for Albania at an international level. He received his first call up for Albania by Skënder Gega, the Albania national under-21 football team coach for the Friendly match against Romania U21 on 8 October 2014.

He made his debut for Albania U21 in the Friendly match against Romania U21 on 8 October 2014 by playing as a starter in a 3–1 loss, where he started his team's first attempt to the goal of in the 11th minute by running from the midfield and shooting as soon as he got close to the 16-meters area, a shot which was put by the Romania U21s' goalkeeper in the corner kick.

Alimi was called up for the first time to participate in a competitive match, the 2017 UEFA European Under-21 Championship qualification opening match against Liechtenstein U21 on 28 March 2015, however, Alimi failed to play in this match as he was ineligible due to the absence of respective documents.

Career statistics

Club

References

External links

1994 births
Living people
People from Struga Municipality
Albanian footballers from North Macedonia
Albanian footballers
Association football midfielders
Association football forwards
Serie A players
Serie C players
FK Ohrid players
F.C. Lumezzane V.G.Z. A.S.D. players
Forlì F.C. players
L.R. Vicenza players
Rimini F.C. 1912 players
Imolese Calcio 1919 players
Albania youth international footballers
Albania under-21 international footballers
Albanian expatriate footballers
Albanian expatriate sportspeople in Italy
Expatriate footballers in Italy